George Cardinal "Babe" Lyon (March 30, 1907 – December 22, 1970) was a professional football player in the National Football League (NFL) and the second American Football League (AFL). Over the span of his career, Babe played for the New York Giants, Portsmouth Spartans, Cleveland Indians, Chicago Bears, Brooklyn Dodgers and St. Louis Gunners of the NFL. He played again in 1936 for the Rochester Tigers of the AFL.

References

 
 Rochester Tigers 1936 roster

1907 births
1970 deaths
American football guards
American football tackles
Brooklyn Dodgers (NFL) players
Chicago Bears players
Cleveland Indians (NFL 1931) players
Kansas State Wildcats football players
New York Giants players
Portsmouth Spartans players
Rochester Tigers players
St. Louis Gunners players
People from Cloud County, Kansas
Players of American football from Kansas